Edgar Dietsche was a Swiss bobsledder who competed during the late 1980s. He won the bronze medals in the four-man event at the 1987 FIBT World Championships in St. Moritz. He died on May 24, 2010.

References
Bobsleigh four-man world championship medalists since 1930

Swiss male bobsledders
Year of birth missing
2010 deaths
20th-century Swiss people